The SPARCclassic (Sun 4/15) is a workstation introduced by Sun Microsystems in November 1992. It is based on the sun4m architecture, and is enclosed in a lunchbox chassis. It shares the code name Sunergy with the SPARCclassic X, SPARCstation LX, and SPARCstation ZX. It was replaced by the SPARCstation 4 in February 1994.

Specifications

CPU support
The SPARCclassic incorporates a single 50 MHz microSPARC processor.

Memory 
The SPARCclassic has three banks with two DSIMM slots each. The official maximum configuration uses 16 MB modules, but the first bank can also hold 32 MB modules giving a maximum of 128MB memory.

Disk drives 
The SPARCclassic can hold one internal 3.5-inch 50-pin, single ended, fast-narrow SCSI drive and a floppy. It also supports external SCSI devices. There is no IDE/ATAPI support.

Network support
The SPARCclassic comes with an on-board AMD Lance Ethernet chipset providing 10BASE-T networking as standard and 10Base2 and 10Base5 via an AUI transceiver. The OpenBoot ROM is able to boot from network, using RARP and TFTP. Like all other SPARCstation systems, the SPARCclassic holds system information such as MAC address and serial number in NVRAM. If the battery on this chip dies, then the system will not be able to boot.

Operating systems
The following operating systems run on a SPARCclassic:
SunOS 4.1.3c onwards
Solaris 2.3 Edition II to Solaris 9
Linux - Some but not all distributions still support this sparc32 sub-architecture
NetBSD/sparc32
OpenBSD/sparc32

Differences between Classic and LX 

The SPARCclassic was designed to be an entry-level workstation with a lower price point than the SPARCstation LX; it has a lower-end CG3 framebuffer rather than the LX's accelerated CG6.  The SPARCclassic also features 8-bit audio as opposed to 16-bit audio for the LX.  The motherboards of the two systems are otherwise similar, and both use the same chassis.

SPARCclassic X 
In July 1993, Sun introduced the SPARCclassic X, a stripped-down SPARCclassic marketed as an X terminal. It shipped with no local storage, and either 4 or 8 MB of memory.

Rather than running Solaris, the SPARCclassic X loaded and ran special software over the network.

Sun offered an upgrade kit to a full workstation that included a hard drive and additional memory.

See also 
 SPARCstation
 SPARCstation LX

References

External links 
 Obsolyte: SPARCstation Classic and LX
 Parts List for SPARCstation Classic
 Official Sun Documentation

Sun workstations
SPARC microprocessor products